Yves Deniaud may refer to:
Yves Deniaud (actor), French comedian
Yves Deniaud (politician), French politician